
Year 74 BC was a year of the pre-Julian Roman calendar. At the time it was known as the Year of the Consulship of Lucullus and Cotta (or, less frequently, year 680 Ab urbe condita). The denomination 74 BC for this year has been used since the early medieval period, when the Anno Domini calendar era became the prevalent method in Europe for naming years.

Events 
 By place 

 Roman Republic 
 Nicomedes IV, last king of Bithynia bequeaths his kingdom to the Roman Senate upon his death (75/4 BC).
 Third Mithridatic War: Battle of Cyzicus: Roman forces under Lucius Lucullus defeat the forces of Mithridates VI of Pontus.
 Marcus Antonius (father of Mark Antony), a praetor, receives wide-ranging powers and considerable resources to fight the pirates in the Mediterranean Sea.
 Publius Servilius Vatia returns to Rome, where he has triumphed against the pirates in Anatolia, and is given the agnomen Isauricus. 
 Cyrene becomes a Roman province.

 Spain 
 Pamplona is founded.

Deaths 
 Lucius Aelius Stilo Praeconinus, Roman philologist
 Lucius Octavius, Roman politician and consul
 Nicomedes IV (Philopator), king of Bithynia
 Zhao of Han, Chinese emperor (b. 94 BC)

References